The following are international rankings of  Hong Kong by categories.

Note: For rankings with negative connotations, the orders are inverted such that the best country/regions are always ranked "1st".

Overall

Economy

Business and Industry

Education

Environment

Health & Safety

Infrastructure

Innovation

Governance

Society

Rankings by Years

The following are international rankings of  Hong Kong by years.

References 

Hong Kong

Hong Kong